Legion of Fire: Killer Ants! (alternatively titled Marabunta) is a 1998 made for TV  horror movie, made for the Fox TV channel.

In 2005, Legion of Fire: Killer Ants! was released on DVD in Germany under the title Marabunta. No announcement has been made on the possibility of an English language release, although it is still shown regularly during the Sci Fi Channel's weekend movie marathons under its alternative name Marabunta. It is also available on NowTV.

Plot
Dr. Jim Conrad is visiting the small town of Burly Pines to fish. While out with a friend, they discover a moose that has been stripped clean of meat.  They presume hunters left it for scavengers, but then the hunters arrive and say they had shot it two hours earlier and had been tracking it since. A shopkeeper is found in the same condition in his home. The authorities think it may have been a predator, but Jim is unsure. During the autopsy, Jim finds something on the man's body. When he looks at it under a microscope, it is the jaws of a marabunta, a South American ant known for traveling in waves, killing everything in their path. After questioning Sheriff Jeff Croy and his men, Jim figures out that the ants must have arrived on a boat that had crashed a few years ago, leaving logs of South American wood behind. The ants had hibernated in the wood until recent seismic activity had made it warm enough to support them.

Jim teams up with Croy and schoolteacher Karen to try to find a way to stop the ants. Jim and Karen go to the beach where the wood from the ship washed up to kill the queen. The ants attack Jim's friend, who is piloting the helicopter. While trying to fight them off, his actions cause the helicopter to lift off and crash into the mountain. Jim and Karen find themselves surrounded by the ants. They hold them off using a flame thrower and shotgun until they can reach a nearby canoe, which they take downstream until they reach a waterfall and go over it. Having survived the falls, they find an old cabin with a motorcycle. They get it started just as the ants reach them and ride it back to town. They convince Croy to evacuate the town. Croy has local Native American Gray Wolf handle the evacuation and tells his son Chad to go with them. When everyone is out of town, Gray Wolf is to blow up the only road out of town. Chad goes back to his father against his wishes and returns to help while Gray Wolf sets up the dynamite. At the school, Jim and Karen create a mixture that can kill the ants, but the ants attack the school. Chad gets trapped in a school bus while Jim and Karen are chased to the school's top floor. Croy arrives in his truck, and they escape with help from Jim's formula. They make their way out of town, but Gray Wolf is forced to blow the pass early when he sees the ants making their way along it.

After determining the ants' pattern, they decide to blow up the local dam and flood the entire town to kill the ants. Jim and Karen get some dynamite and head to the dam. They leave Chad in Croy's truck parked on top of the dam as a lookout while they dig holes in the earthen side of the dam at intervals and insert the dynamite with different length fuses. While they are working, a rescue helicopter, sent by Gray Wolf, arrives to carry them out of town. Chad gets in, and once they have lit the dynamite, Croy and Karen join him. Jim has trouble lighting his fuse, and an aftershock knocks him down, but he is finally able to get it lit. The pilot flies the helicopter down to where Jim is, and, with Croy's help, he gets aboard just as the dynamite explodes.

The dam is destroyed, and the water floods the entire valley, including the town. The pilot lands the helicopter on a nearby hill, and the group looks at the flooded valley, hoping the ants have drowned. Jim decides to stay for a while to study the area more. He warns the group that they cannot be sure all of the ants died and that any survivors would probably go back underground and into hibernation. As the movie ends, surviving ants, including the queen, are shown walking on some stones near the water's edge, where it is discovered the queen has wings, thus potentially repeating the cycle.

Critical reception
The movie did not fare well with critics. In the Minneapolis Star Tribune, a reviewer commented that the movie "continues a great, cheesy tradition of ant-menace movies." The Encyclopedia of Fantastic Film calls it a "standard SF-thriller."
Eric Fowler at the Indianapolis Morning Register was less kind, calling the film, "a blot on the history of sci-fi and an insult to ants everywhere."

References

External links 
 

1998 television films
1998 films
1998 horror films
1990s disaster films
American disaster films
American science fiction horror films
Disaster television films
Films about ants
Fox network original films
American horror television films
Films scored by Daniel Licht
1990s English-language films
1990s American films